Dez Mona is a Belgian band formed in 2003, playing a combination of jazz, gospel, spirituals and drama. The band revolves around singer Gregory Frateur and bassist Nicolas Rombouts. The duo is sometimes joined by Sam Vloemans on trumpet and Roel van Camp on accordion. The group has been compared to Nina Simone (who the group have covered), Marianne Faithfull, Antony & The Johnsons and Tom Waits.

The band's third album, Hilfe Kommt, was produced by former Talk Talk bassist Paul Webb.

Discography

 Moments of Dejection Or Despondency (2007), Radical Duke
 Hilfe Kommt (2009), 62TV
 Pursued Sinners (2010)
 Saga (2011)
 A Gentleman's Agreement (2012)
 The Red Piece (2013)
 Origin (2015)
Book of Many (2019)

References

External links

Belgian jazz ensembles